Ministry of Taxation may refer to:
 The Danish Ministry of Taxation, Skatteministeriet
 The former Ministry of Taxation of the Russian Federation, which became the Federal Tax Service (Russia) in 2004
 Dubious or rare use as alternate name for the Japanese

See also
Ministry of Taxes (Azerbaijan)
National Tax Agency (modern Japan)